Tuvalu competed at the 2014 Summer Youth Olympics, in Nanjing, China from 16 August to 28 August 2014.

Athletics

Tuvalu qualified one athlete.

Qualification Legend: Q=Final A (medal); qB=Final B (non-medal); qC=Final C (non-medal); qD=Final D (non-medal); qE=Final E (non-medal)

Boys
Field Events

Beach Volleyball

Tuvalu was given a team to compete from the tripartite committee.

See also
Tuvalu at the 2014 Commonwealth Games

References

Olympics
Nations at the 2014 Summer Youth Olympics
2014